Rasma is a Latvian given name and may refer to: 
Rasma Garne (born 1941), Latvian actress
Rasma Kārkliņa (born 1946), Latvian political scientist

References

Latvian feminine given names
Feminine given names